Drummerworld is a Swiss drum website created by Bernhard Castiglioni in 1997. The site focuses on the biographies of prominent rock and jazz drummers and drum lessons, along with a discussion forum.

Popularity and awards
Half of Drummerworld's userbase is from the United States or Canada, though has visitors from 248 countries. It was recognised by Drum! magazine as the best drumming website from 2006-2013 and in 2015, earning a Drummie award in those years.

The forum was cited as one of the "Best Drum Forums Still Active" by Drumming Review in 2023.

Notes

External links
Drummerworld.com

Drumming
Swiss music websites